Baijanath Rural Municipality is a Gaunpalika in Banke District in Lumbini Province of Nepal. On 12 March 2017, the government of Nepal implemented a new local administrative structure, with the implementation of the new local administrative structure, VDCs have been replaced with municipal and Village Councils. Baijanath is one of these 753 local units.

Demographics
At the time of the 2011 Nepal census, Baijanath Rural Municipality had a population of 54,987. Of these, 60.0% spoke Nepali, 35.5% Tharu, 2.0% Magar, 1.5% Awadhi, 0.3% Urdu, 0.2% Hindi, 0.1% Maithili, 0.1% Doteli and 0.3% other languages as their first language.

In terms of ethnicity/caste, 36.6% were Tharu, 27.3% Chhetri, 9.7% Kami, 7.8% Magar, 5.9% Thakuri, 4.7% Hill Brahmin, 3.1% Damai/Dholi, 1.1% Sanyasi/Dasnami, 0.8% Gurung and 3.0% others.

In terms of religion, 94.8% were Hindu, 2.4% Buddhist, 2.3% Christian and 0.5% Muslim.

References 

Populated places in Banke District
Rural municipalities of Nepal established in 2017